The canton of Trets is an administrative division of the Bouches-du-Rhône department, in southeastern France. At the French canton reorganisation which came into effect in March 2015, it was expanded from 7 to 18 communes. Its seat is in Trets.

It consists of the following communes: 

Beaurecueil 
Châteauneuf-le-Rouge
Fuveau
Jouques
Meyrargues
Meyreuil
Peynier
Peyrolles-en-Provence
Puyloubier
Le Puy-Sainte-Réparade
Rousset
Saint-Antonin-sur-Bayon
Saint-Marc-Jaumegarde
Saint-Paul-lès-Durance
Le Tholonet
Trets
Vauvenargues
Venelles

References

Cantons of Bouches-du-Rhône